Christmas in the Stars: Star Wars Christmas Album is a record album produced in 1980 by RSO Records. It features recordings of Star Wars-themed Christmas songs and stories about a droid factory where the robots make toys year-round for "S. Claus".

Much of the album is sung and narrated by British actor Anthony Daniels, reprising his role as C-3PO from the Star Wars films, and written by composer-lyricist Maury Yeston. Sound designer Ben Burtt also provided sound effects for R2-D2 and Chewbacca.

Production 
The album was produced by Meco Monardo (who had previously recorded Star Wars and Other Galactic Funk), with the hope that this would be the first in a series of annual Star Wars Christmas albums. The title, the story, and the majority of the album's original songs, both music and lyrics, were written by Yeston, then a Yale University music professor who went on to become the twice Tony Award-winning Broadway musical composer of Nine, Titanic, and Grand Hotel. One of his songs, "What Can You Get a Wookiee for Christmas (When He Already Owns a Comb)", with vocals by Yeston, went on to become a recurring top-40  X-mas hit. The album was written in 1979, before the darker The Empire Strikes Back (1980) appeared, and the fun and light tone of it was targeted for the young audience (Yeston’s own son was then 7) that had fallen in love with Artoo, Threepio, the Droids and the Wookiee.

The album is notable for featuring the first professional recording of Jon Bon Jovi (credited as "John Bongiovi", his birth name), who sang lead vocals on the song "R2-D2 We Wish You a Merry Christmas." His cousin Tony Bongiovi co-produced the album and ran the recording studio at which it was recorded, where Jon was working sweeping floors at the time.

After the first printing of 150,000 copies, Meco was asked to include George Lucas' name, credited beside his under "Concept by". Due to the success of the album, the studios were ready to do a second printing, which would give Lucas credit. But before the second record pressing was done, RSO Records shut down due to an unrelated lawsuit.

Track listing 
 "Christmas in the Stars" – 3:17
 "Bells, Bells, Bells" – 3:15
 "The Odds Against Christmas" – 3:04
 "What Can You Get a Wookiee for Christmas (When He Already Owns a Comb?)" – 3:24
 "R2D2 We Wish You a Merry Christmas" – 3:16
 "Sleigh Ride" – 3:36
 "Merry, Merry Christmas" – 2:09
 "A Christmas Sighting ('Twas the Night Before Christmas)" – 3:43
 "The Meaning of Christmas" – 8:08

Release

LP and cassette
The complete album was released by RSO records on LP and Cassette in November 1980, to cash in on the increasingly popular Star Wars saga. This original printing featured cover art by Star Wars production artist, Ralph McQuarrie. The cassette version is now quite rare and hard to come by.

Also in 1980, RSO released a 45 of "What Can You Get a Wookiee for Christmas (When He Already Owns a Comb)" (credited to The Star Wars Intergalactic Droid Choir and Chorale- actually Yeston's voice, modulated to sound 'robotic', and multi-tracked. Yeston is also the voice of Santa on "The Meaning of Christmas") backed with "R2-D2 We Wish You a Merry Christmas" with a picture sleeve. In late 1983, a second 45 from the album was released by Polygram on the RSO label, "R2D2's Sleigh Ride" backed with "Christmas in the Stars", also with a picture sleeve.

This album was one of the music industry's first non-classical-or-jazz projects to be recorded and mixed digitally, and when "What Can You Get a Wookiee for Christmas (When He Already Owns a Comb)" reached No. 69 on the Billboard Hot 100 chart in 1980 it was only the third digitally recorded single in Billboard's chart history.

CD editions
In November 1990, Polydor Records Japan released a 3-inch CD single featuring the songs "R2-D2 We Wish You a Merry Christmas" and "Christmas in the Stars". While the full album made its CD debut in 1994 as an unheralded budget-label release by JFC/Polygram Special Markets with all artwork and references to Star Wars (except those in the song titles) removed from the packaging. The only credit on the package was "Meco" and it's cover featured a generic photo of Christmas boxes and decorations.
However, in October 1996, during the popularity of the Star Wars: Shadows of the Empire project, the album was re-released on CD by Rhino Records with Ralph McQuarrie's original, 1980 cover art restored.

References

External links 
 Official StarWars.com database entry for the album
 An interview with Meco regarding the album.
The 1996 CD release on Amazon.com.
Meco interview.

1980 Christmas albums
Music of Star Wars
Christmas albums by American artists
RSO Records albums
Concept albums
Meco albums